Glaucina eupetheciaria is a species of geometrid moth in the family Geometridae. It is found in Central America and North America.

The MONA or Hodges number for Glaucina eupetheciaria is 6496.

Subspecies
These four subspecies belong to the species Glaucina eupetheciaria:
 Glaucina eupetheciaria escariola Rindge, 1959
 Glaucina eupetheciaria eupetheciaria
 Glaucina eupetheciaria lucida Rindge, 1959
 Glaucina eupetheciaria osiana Druce, 1893

References

Further reading

 

Boarmiini
Articles created by Qbugbot
Moths described in 1883